10 Vulpeculae is an astrometric binary star system in the northern constellation of Vulpecula. It is faintly visible to the naked eye with an apparent visual magnitude of 5.497. It is moving closer to the Sun with a heliocentric radial velocity of −9.9 km/s.

The system is a source of X-ray emission. The visible component is an aging giant star with a stellar classification of G8 III. At the age of 1.15 billion years, it has exhausted the hydrogen at its core region and expanded off the main sequence. It is about 13 times the Sun's radius and 2.35 times the Sun's mass. The star is radiating 72 times the Sun's luminosity from its enlarged photosphere at an effective temperature of 5,008 K.

References

External links
 

G-type giants
Vulpecula
Vulpeculae, 10
Durchmusterung objects
186486
097077
7506
Astrometric binaries